Eustictus is a genus of plant bugs in the family Miridae. There are more than 30 described species in Eustictus.

Species
These 39 species belong to the genus Eustictus:

 Eustictus ainsliei Knight, 1927
 Eustictus albocuneatus Knight, 1927
 Eustictus albomaculatus Johnston, 1939
 Eustictus amazonicus Carvalho, 1988
 Eustictus argentinus Carvalho, 1990
 Eustictus brunnipunctatus Maldonado, 1969
 Eustictus californicus Carvalho & Costa, 1991
 Eustictus catulus (Uhler, 1894)
 Eustictus claripennis Knight, 1925
 Eustictus clarus Knight, 1925
 Eustictus goianus Carvalho, 1952
 Eustictus grossus (Uhler, 1887)
 Eustictus guaraniensis Carvalho & Carpintero, 1986
 Eustictus hirsutipes Knight, 1925
 Eustictus incaicus Carvalho, 1987
 Eustictus itatiaiensis Carvalho, 1990
 Eustictus knighti Johnston, 1930
 Eustictus membragilus Carvalho & Costa, 1991
 Eustictus minimus Knight, 1925
 Eustictus morrisoni Knight, 1925
 Eustictus mundus (Uhler, 1887)
 Eustictus necopinus Knight, 1923
 Eustictus nicaraguensis Carvalho & Costa, 1991
 Eustictus obscurus Knight, 1925
 Eustictus oscurus Maldonado, 1969
 Eustictus panamensis Carvalho, 1990
 Eustictus pilipes Knight, 1926
 Eustictus productus Knight, 1925
 Eustictus pubescens Knight, 1926
 Eustictus pusillus (Uhler, 1887)
 Eustictus roraimensis Carvalho & Gomes, 1972
 Eustictus salicicola Knight, 1923
 Eustictus setosus Barber, 1954
 Eustictus sonorensis Carvalho & Costa, 1991
 Eustictus soroaensis Hernandez & Henry, 2010
 Eustictus spinipes Knight, 1926
 Eustictus tibialis Knight, 1927
 Eustictus venatorius Van Duzee, 1912
 Eustictus venezuelanus Carvalho, 1990

References

Further reading

 
 
 

Miridae genera
Articles created by Qbugbot
Deraeocorini